Martin Stoyanov Stoev (born 3 October 1971 in Sofia) is a Bulgarian volleyball coach and former player. He currently is head coach of the Romanian team CVM Tomis Constanța.

He played volleyball from 1984 until 2005, with over 200 caps with the Bulgarian national team. He was a 3 time National champion of Bulgaria (twice with the team of Levski Siconco, one with Minior Buhovo).

From 2005 to 2008 he was the head coach of the Bulgaria men's national volleyball team, finishing 3 consecutive times in top 5 of the World League.

External links

1971 births
Living people
Bulgarian men's volleyball players
Sportspeople from Sofia
Expatriate volleyball players in Tunisia
Volleyball players at the 1996 Summer Olympics
Olympic volleyball players of Bulgaria
Bulgarian volleyball coaches
Bulgarian expatriate sportspeople in Romania